A deadly cold wave started in Europe on January 27, 2012, and brought snow and freezing temperatures to much of the continent. There were more than 824 reported deaths in both Europe and North Africa. The heaviest snow was recorded in the Balkan region. The cold weather was a result of an extensive area of very high pressure located over the north east of the continent in northern Russia, which circulated cold air from the east.

Countries affected

Effects

Eastern, Northern and Western Europe

The northern half of Europe was affected primarily by greater cold and – except for a period of early snow – low precipitation. On Sunday, January 22, heavy snowfall in northern Námestovo caused an ice rink to collapse under the weight of the snow.

The Ukrainian government announced that many of the public safety issues it was encountering were related to alcohol abuse in the context of the dangerously cold weather.

The Mediterranean coast of southern France was covered in deep snow by the end of January. Corsica was buried under  of snow, and at times there were as many as 14,000 homes without electricity.

In early February, heavy snow pile-ups hit the Helsinki region. Belgium also was surprised by the snowfall.

In Germany, the Elbe downstream of Magdeburg became impassable due to ice, as well as the entire Elbe–Havel Canal and parts of the Rhine–Main–Danube Canal. Supplies had to be sent to the island of Spiekeroog via aircraft for the second time in its history, as the ferry service was canceled on February 7, 2012, due to heavy ice conditions in the North Sea. On Lake Constance, the catamaran speed-boat traffic between Friedrichshafen and Konstanz had to be canceled due to the icing over of the port in Konstanz on February 7 until further notice. This port had not been frozen to such an extent since the winter of 1962–1963.

Mediterranean Sea, Danube and Balkans

Italy, the Balkans and the Danube were in addition to cold weather also affected by heavy snowfall; Erfrierungsopfer also reported the majority of countries of this area, as well as extensive traffic delays and economic consequences. The cold wave covered the Maghreb in the western Mediterranean, as well as the Aegean, the Turkey and the Levant in the eastern part of the Mediterranean area.
Turkey, Spain and Portugal fell to low temperatures in early February, the temperature sometimes considerably below the freezing point. Snow fell in Mallorca for the first time since 1956, and even in Algiers, Algeria and southern Tunisia in Gabès.
In Italy, there were extensive power outages (up to 120,000 people were without electricity) as well as traffic congestion, and  the Army had to intervene for snow removal: in Rome, where snow had fallen before the weekend of February 4–5, it was almost impossible to drive. Until the second week of February reigned throughout northern and central Italy tiefwinterliche conditions, particularly in Marche, in Umbria, the Abruzzi and Emilia-Romagna. In Rome, after the snowfalls of February 11–12, 2,000 passengers had to spend the night in Fiumicino airport.

Europe
 – In Bosnia and Herzegovina, this year's winter was one of the coldest and snowiest in the last 100 years. The snow depth in the capital Sarajevo reached 111 cm (43.7 inches) and in Mostar 86 cm (34 inches). On February 5 in Sarajevo, 5 people died because of cold weather in 3 hours. Snow and low temperatures stayed persistent until the month of March when drought hit the country. In March, not even 1 liter of precipitation fell throughout the whole country. In Sarajevo snow cover stayed until April. The cold wave killed anywhere from 15 to 50 people.

 – Early in the day on January 30, subzero temperatures spread rapidly, data accessed by AccuWeather showed. According to National Agency BielTA, from January 1, more than 180 people died in domestic fires. Total number of casualties remain unknown.
 – Over 1 meter (3.3 feet) of snow fell in the mountainous areas of the country. Heavy snow fell also in many major cities. The snow depth reached 63 cm (24.8 inches) in Vidin, 61 cm (24 inches) in Vratsa and 48 cm (19 inches) in the capital Sofia. The wall of the Ivanovo dam in southern Haskovo Province broke, flooding the village of Biser and killing 11 people, as well as inflicting serious infrastructural damage. At least 16 other deaths were reported throughout the country, due to the arctic temperatures.
 – As of February 6, three people died, with many villages being cut off, especially near Vrgorac and Imotski. The region of Dalmatia was most affected, with strong bora interrupting the power supply and heavy snowfall blocking traffic even in some coastal towns. Split experienced a record snowfall of 25 cm (9.8 inches).
 – On February 29, it was reported that there was snowfall in Capital, Nicosia. 
Wind chill temperatures were near .
 – On February 6, BBC News reported 4 deaths, and 43 regions in France on high alert for 'exceptional' weather conditions. On February 11, the Six Nations Championship game between France and Ireland, was postponed shortly before kick-off, due to the pitch freezing, as temperatures plummeted beneath .
 – Rome experienced a rare intense snowfall, and many of Venice's canals have frozen over, while very heavy snowfalls (up to 2m/7 ft in a couple of weeks) occurred in the Apennines. At least 54 people have died.

 – Many homeless people froze to death and a dam on the Evros river burst due to pressure.
 – The lowest temperature was recorded at the Strenči meteorological station, hitting  on February 5. For several days not a single meteorological station reported a temperature above . Because of the severe cold wave, some regions in Latvia experienced a shortage of power supply, an increased number of domestic fires were reported.
 – The lowest temperature at grass level was measured at Zebbug. It was measured on Wednesday, February 8.
A homeless man was frozen to death on February 2. People have been ice-skating on the canals of Amsterdam.
 – Early in the day on January 30, subzero cold spread widely over Belarus, Ukraine, Romania, Bulgaria, Serbia and eastern Poland, data accessed by AccuWeather.com showed. From the January 1, 2012, 103 people froze to death. Fire and Rescue Service reported 360 domestic fires during one night (February 11–12), and almost 12000 fire accidents this year. Reports state 107 people died in flames with 550 more suffer various degrees of burns. Due to carbon monoxide poisoning 24 people died.

 – At least 86 people have died. In some areas, the bitter cold was followed by heavy snow. The snow depth in the capital Bucharest reached 60 cm (23.5 inches). 

 – European Russia experienced widespread subzero cold. The Ministry of Health and Social Development stated on February 13, that the cold had killed 215 people since January 1.

 – Sjenica set , early on the morning of February 9. In Serbia at least 50,000 villagers have been trapped by heavy snow and blizzards in mountainous areas. Gas supplies are running low. On February 8, electricity consumption broke a record, standing at 162.67 million kWh, so the government mandated a shutdown of all non-essential industries and decorative lightning. The death toll has risen to 20.
 – Palma, Majorca registered the most important snow episode since 1956.
 – On January 31, heavy snow blanketed Istanbul, covering the Blue Mosque. 102 flights were cancelled at Atatürk International Airport.
Gas supplies were running low. The cold led to more than 600 people being treated for frostbite and hypothermia within three days, according to officials. Nearly 24,000 people sought shelter during the same three days, the BBC reported. Ukrainian health officials stated (on February 16) 151 people had died because of the cold, with alcohol regularly a contributing factor, the highest number in Europe.
 – The Met Office issued a severe weather warning as heavy snow fell across much of the country on February 4, disrupting roads and flights. More heavy snow fell overnight in England on February 9–10.

Africa

 – The north of the country awoke to a blanket of snow, 28 of 48 departments of the country have had snow, including Algiers and even parts of Sahara Desert. Snow covered Algerian lower cities at least for several days, while higher cities like Sétif (1100 m AMSL) were covered by snow for weeks.

As of February 9, more than 80 people had died because of the cold wave (Forty-four people died during the first week of the cold wave); thirty of them were killed in car accidents caused by icy roads, and 14 died from asphyxiation due to gas fumes.

The following cities recorded snowfall:

 Ain Sefra: 4–6, February 8, 2012
 Algiers: February 4–5, 2012
 Batna: February 3–7, 2012
 Béjaïa: February 4–5, 2012
 Blida
 Bordj Bou Arréridj: January 30, 2012; 4–7, February 9, 11, 13–14, 2012
 Bouira
 Boumerdes
 Constantine: 3–9, February 11–14, 2012
 Djelfa: February 3–5, 2012
 El Bayadh: January 29–30, 2012; 3–8, 11–13, February 21–22, 2012
 El Kheiter: 3–5, February 12, 2012
 Jijel: February 4, 2012
 Mila
 Miliana: January 29–30, 2012; 3–8, February 12–14, 2012
 Médéa: January 30–31, 2012; 3–6, 8–9, 11, 13–15, February 21–22, 2012
 Naâma: 3–6, February 8, 2012
 Oum El Bouaghi: January 30, 2012; February 4–9, 2012
 Sétif: January 29–31, 2012; 3–9, 11–15, February 21–22, 2012
 Souk Ahras: January 30, 2012; 3–8, 11–12, 14, February 16, 2012
 Tébessa: January 29–30, 2012; 3–7, February 11–12, 2012
 Tiaret: 3–5, 8, 11, 13–14, February 22, 2012
 Tipaza
 Tizi-Ouzou: 3–5, 7, February 13, 2012

 – Snowfalls were recorded in Gabès.
 – On February 6, snow fell in Gharyan, Ghadames and Al-Bayda; meanwhile small hail blanketed Tripoli, where people confused it with snow, which is a very rare event.

Asia
 – Zvartnots and Shirak international airports are closed due to heavy snowfall.
Heydar Aliyev International Airport in Baku also suffered a serious problems and had to cancel some flights.
 – On February 7, Georgian press reported that the country was experiencing the coldest winter in nearly 50 years, with important water bodies, such as Mtkvari and Tbilisi sea freezing over.

Minimum Temperatures measured during the cold-wave 

 Finland: -42.7°C (6 February) 
 Ukraine: -35.0°C (3 February)
 Belarus: -34.3°C (12 February)
 Estonia: -35.0°C (5 February)
 Denmark: -25.9°C (5 February)
 Italy: -23.9°C (7 February) 
 Greece: -15.0°C (10 February)
 Malta: -2.4°C (8 February)
 Netherlands: -22.9°C (4 February) 
 Serbia: -32.0°C (9 February) 
 Turkey: -34.0°C (9 February) 
 United Kingdom: -18.3°C (11 February)
 Azerbaijan: -14.0°C (8 February)

See also 
Cyclone Julia

References

External links

Cold Wave over the Eurasian Continent, Japan Meteorological Agency.

Cold wave
2012 cold waves
2012 disasters in Europe
Articles containing video clips
Cold waves in Europe
January 2012 events in Europe
February 2012 events in Europe